The Çaldağ mine is a large mine in the west of Turkey in Turgutlu District, Manisa Province 232 km west of the capital, Ankara., Çaldağ represents the largest nickel reserve in Turkey having estimated reserves of 33.2 million tonnes of ore grading 1.13% nickel. The 33.2 million tonnes of ore contains 375,000 tonnes of nickel metal.

References

External links 
 Official site

Nickel mines in Turkey
Buildings and structures in Manisa Province